Niccolò is an Italian male given name, derived from the Greek Nikolaos meaning "Victor of people" or "People's champion".
There are several male variations of the name: Nicolò, Niccolò, Nicolas, and Nicola. The female equivalent is Nicole. The female diminutive Nicoletta is used although seldom. Rarely, the letter "C" can be followed by a "H" (ex. Nicholas). As the letter "K" is not part of the Italian alphabet, versions where "C" is replaced by "K" are even rarer.   

People with the name include:

In literature:
 Niccolò Ammaniti, Italian writer
 Niccolò Machiavelli, political philosopher, musician, poet, and romantic comedic playwright
 Niccolò Massa, Italian anatomist who wrote an early anatomy text Anatomiae Libri Introductorius in 1536

In music:
 Niccolò Castiglioni, Italian composer and pianist
 Niccolò da Perugia, Italian composer of the trecento
 Niccolò Jommelli, Italian composer
 Niccolò Paganini, Italian violinist, violist, guitarist and composer
 Niccolò Piccinni, Italian composer of classical music and opera
 Niccolò Antonio Zingarelli, composer

In Mannerism:

 Niccolò dell'Abbate, Italian Mannerist painter and decorator
 Niccolò Tribolo, Florentine Mannerist artist in the service of Cosimo I de' Medici

In other fields:

 Niccolò Alamanni, Roman antiquary of Greek origin
 Niccolò Cacciatore, Italian astronomer
 Niccolò Canepa, Genovese motorcycle racer, competing in MotoGP with Ducati, 2007 Superstock 1000 F.I.M. Cup world champion
 Niccolò Da Conti, Venetian merchant and explorer
 Niccolò Matas, Italian architect
 Niccolò de' Niccoli, Italian Renaissance humanist
 Niccolò Piccinino, Italian condottiero
 Niccolò Polo, Venetian merchant and explorer, father of Marco Polo.
 Niccolò Fontana Tartaglia, mathematician
 Niccolò II and Niccolò III d'Este, rulers of Ferrara

Fictional characters;
 Nicholas de Fleury, central character in The House of Niccolò series of books by Dorothy Dunnett

See also

 Niccolò I (disambiguation)
 Niccolò II (disambiguation)
 Niccolò III (disambiguation)
 Nicolò (disambiguation)
 San Niccolò (disambiguation)
 
 
 

Italian masculine given names